Kandisha may refer to:
 Kandisha (2008 film), a Moroccan horror film
 Kandisha (2020 film), a French horror film